Paul Son (born January 27, 2003) is an American soccer player who plays as a left-back for USL Championship club Las Vegas Lights.

Club career
Born in Anaheim, California, Son began his career with U.S. Soccer Development Academy side Strikers FC in 2016. In 2019, Son joined the youth setup at Major League Soccer club Los Angeles FC. On May 5, 2021, it was announced that Son, along with three other academy players, had signed USL academy contracts with Los Angeles FC's USL Championship affiliate club Las Vegas Lights. The academy contract allowed Son to play with professionals while maintaining NCAA college soccer eligibility.

Son made his professional debut for Las Vegas Lights on May 12, 2021 against Sacramento Republic. He came on as an 84th minute substitute for Danny Musovski as Lights lose 3–1.

Career statistics

References

External links
 Profile at Los Angeles FC

2003 births
Living people
Soccer players from Anaheim, California
American soccer players
Association football defenders
Las Vegas Lights FC players
USL Championship players